The 1977 United Bank Classic, also known as the Denver WCT, was a men's tennis tournament played on indoor carpet courts in Denver, Colorado in the United States that was part of the 3 star category of the 1977 Grand Prix circuit. It was the sixth edition of the tournament and took place from April 18 through April 24, 1977. First-seeded Björn Borg won the singles competition.

Finals

Singles
 Björn Borg defeated  Brian Gottfried 7–5, 6–2
 It was Borg's 4th singles title of the year and the 23rd of his career.

Doubles
 Colin Dibley /  Geoff Masters defeated  Syd Ball /  Kim Warwick 6–2, 6–3

References

External links
 ITF tournament edition details

United Bank Classic
Indoor tennis tournaments
United Bank Classic
United Bank Classic
United Bank Classic